The Unified Launch Vehicle (ULV) is a family of modular expendable launch vehicles, currently under development by the Indian Space Research Organisation (ISRO). This vehicle is designed to replace the PSLV, GSLV Mk I/II and GSLV Mk III with a single family of launchers.

The design may include a heavy-lift variant dubbed HLV, consisting of the SC-160 stage and two solid rocket boosters, as well as a super heavy-lift variant called SHLV with a cluster stage of five SCE-200 engines. As SCE-200 will only fly after the successful completion of the Gaganyaan program, the launcher will not fly before 2023.

Design
As of May 2013, based on ISRO data, the design comprised a common core and upper stage, with four different booster sizes. All four versions of the boosters are solid motors, with at least three versions reusing current motors from the PSLV, GSLV Mk I/II and LVM3. The core, known as the SC160 (Semi-Cryogenic stage with 160 tonnes of propellant, in the ISRO nomenclature), would have  of Kerosene / LOX propellant and be powered by a single SCE-200 rocket engine. The upper stage, known as the C30 (Cryogenic stage with 30 tonnes of propellant) would have  of LH2 / LOX propellant and be powered by a single CE-20 engine.

The four booster options are:
 6 × S-13, slightly larger than the S-12 on PSLV, to burn longer;
 2 × S-60, which appears to be a new solid motor development;
 2 × S-139, which is the first stage of PSLV and GSLV Mk I/II;
 2 × S-200, like on the LVM3.

In September 2021, in a virtual event being conducted by ISRO, the presentation mentioned a fleet about configuration of a family of five rockets capable of lifting from 4.9 tonnes to 16 tonnes to geostationary transfer orbit (GTO). The presentation mentioned about ongoing development of a new semi-cryogenic stage namely SC120 and upgraded cryogenic stage namely C32. The configurations displayed about more powerful engines stages; SC-400 semi-cryogenic stage, C27 cryogenic stage and S2250 solid rocket boosters.

Variants 
Heavy Lift Launch Vehicle (HLV-Variant):-

A potential heavy-lift variant (HLV) of the unified launcher capable of placing up to 10 ton class of spacecraft into Geosynchronous Transfer Orbit would include:
 A larger dual S-250 solid strap-on boosters as compared to the S-200 boosters used in LVM3;
 A L-400 semi-cryogenic core stage, with 400 tonnes of propellant, using a cluster of five SCE-200 engines;
 A L-27 cryogenic third stage, with 27 tonnes of propellant, using CE-20 engine.

Comparable rockets
Angara (rocket family)
Ariane 6
Delta IV Heavy
H3
Long March (rocket family)
Proton rocket
Vulcan Centaur

See also
 
Comparison of orbital launchers families
Comparison of orbital launch systems
GSLV Mk I/II
LVM3
Gaganyaan
PSLV

References

External links
 ULV Description
 ULV development discussion

Satish Dhawan Space Centre
ISRO space launch vehicles